Principal Mutual Fund is a daughter venture of Principal Financial Group, a global financial company, based out in United States. [].

History 
On 25 November 1994, it constituted trust in accordance with the Indian Trusts Act, 1992. Industrial Development Bank of India (IDBI) initially set up the fund by the execution of a deed under which IDBI was the only Sponsor, Settlor, and Principal Trustee, with an initial amount of Rs. 1 lakh and an additional amount of Rs. 24.99 crore was settled as the trust corpus.

Principal Financial Services Inc., USA, along with IDBI, became the deemed sponsor by acquiring a 50% stake in IDBI-Principal Asset Management Company Limited On 21 March 2000. Principal Financial Services Inc. USA acquired a 100% stake in IDBI-PRINCIPAL Trustee Company On 23 June 2003.

On 5 May 2004 – Vijaya Bank and Punjab National Bank became equal shareholders of the Trustee Company. Subsequently, Vijaya Bank and Punjab National Bank held 5%, 30% respectively of the paid-up equity capital of the Trustee Company.

Punjab National Bank offloaded its entire stake in Principal PNB Asset Management Company Pvt Ltd and Principal Trustee Company Pvt Ltd in favor of Principal Group. Principal Financial Group reported the completion of the buyback of all shares of PNB that gave Principal complete ownership of Principal PNB Asset Management Company Private Limited. In 2022 Sundaram Mutual fund comapny has aquired the Principle mutual fund AMC.

Assets
It has Rs. 7090 crore in assets under its management.

See also 

 Mutual funds in India

References 

Mutual funds of India
Financial services companies established in 2000
2000 establishments in Maharashtra
Financial services companies based in Mumbai